Jesu is the first full-length album by British experimental music band Jesu, released through Hydra Head Records on 8 December 2004. Unlike the Heart Ache EP, where Justin Broadrick executed all instrumentation himself, this release features Ted Parsons on drums, Diarmuid Dalton on bass, and a guest appearance by Paul Neville on guitar on the track "Man/Woman". The album was released in Japan by Daymare Recordings and contains two additional instrumental remixes on a bonus disc. In February 2005, a double vinyl picture disc set was released by Hydra Head, limited to 1000 copies.

In 2022, Broadrick said Tired of Me is one of his favorite songs as it documented the painful moment in his life at the time, which was the dissolution of Godflesh (the musical group he'd led since the 1980s) and the break-up of his long-time romantic relationship.

Track listing

Personnel
Jesu
Justin Broadrick – guitar, vocals, bass, programming
Ted Parsons – drums, percussion
Diarmuid Dalton – bass ("Your Path to Divinity", "Tired of Me", "We All Faulter", "Guardian Angel")
Paul Neville – guitar ("Man/Woman")

Technical personnel
Justin K. Broadrick – production, photography
Lars Klokkerhaug, Lars Sorensen – engineering
Aaron Turner – design, layout

Release history

References

Jesu (band) albums
Albums produced by Justin Broadrick
2004 debut albums
Industrial albums by British artists
Hydra Head Records albums